Anglo-Afghan War may refer to:

 British-Afghan Wars
 First Anglo-Afghan War (1839–1842)
 Second Anglo-Afghan War (1878–1880)
 Siege of Malakand & Tirah Campaign (1897)
 Third Anglo-Afghan War (1919)
 Operation Herrick (War in Afghanistan; November 2001 – December 2014)
 Operation Toral (War in Afghanistan; December 2014 – August 2021)
 American-Afghan War
 Operation Enduring Freedom (November 2001 – December 2014)
 Operation Freedom's Sentinel (December 2014 – August 2021)

See also
 European influence in Afghanistan, where the backdrop for the three colonial-era Anglo−Afghan wars mentioned above is discussed
 The Great Game, where the geopolitical aspects of the wars are reviewed
 War in Afghanistan (disambiguation), overview of different periods or phases of wars in Afghanistan